Asao is both a Japanese surname and a masculine Japanese given name. Notable people with the name include:

Surname:
 Eliran Asao (born 1985), footballer
, politician
, volleyballer
, baseballer

Given name:
, Japanese physician, academic and medical researcher
, Japanese actor
, Japanese actor

See also
 Asao (codec)
 Asao-ku, Kawasaki

Japanese-language surnames
Japanese masculine given names